Justin Paul Viele (born November 13, 1990) is an American professional baseball hitting  coach for the San Francisco Giants of Major League Baseball (MLB). He attended Santa Clara University. Viele was drafted by the Baltimore Orioles in the 37th round of the 2013 MLB draft.

High school, college, and playing career
Viele attended Esperanza High School in Anaheim, California. Undrafted out of high school, he attended Santa Clara University for four years (2010–2013). Viele graduated from Santa Clara with a Bachelor of Arts in Sociology.

Viele was drafted by the Baltimore Orioles in the 37th round of the 2013 MLB draft. He spent 2013 and 2014 in the Baltimore organization, playing for the Gulf Coast Orioles, Aberdeen IronBirds, and  Delmarva Shorebirds.

Coaching career
Viele began his coaching career in 2015, as an assistant coach for the Frederick Keys in the Baltimore organization. He returned to Santa Clara University as an assistant coach for the 2015–16 and 2016–2017 seasons. Viele joined the Los Angeles Dodgers organization in 2017, serving as the hitting coach for the Ogden Raptors in the Pioneer League. He served as the hitting coach for the Rancho Cucamonga Quakes in the Class A-Advanced California League in 2018. Viele served as the hitting coach for the Glendale Desert Dogs of the Arizona Fall League in 2018. In 2019, he served as the hitting coach for the Great Lakes Loons in the Class A Midwest League.

Viele joined the San Francisco Giants as a hitting coach prior to the 2020 season.

References

External links

Santa Clara Broncos bio

1990 births
Living people
Sportspeople from Fullerton, California
Baseball coaches from California
Baseball players from California
Baseball infielders
Major League Baseball hitting coaches
San Francisco Giants coaches
Santa Clara Broncos baseball players
Gulf Coast Orioles players
Aberdeen IronBirds players
Delmarva Shorebirds players
Santa Clara Broncos baseball coaches
Minor league baseball coaches
Santa Clara University alumni
Eau Claire Express players